The 1988–89 Yorkshire Cup was the eighty-first occasion on which this rugby league Yorkshire Cup competition was held.

Leeds won the trophy by beating the previous season's runner-up, Castleford, with a score of 33-12.
The match was played at Elland Road,  Leeds, now in West Yorkshire. The attendance was 22,968 and receipts were £83,591.
This was the sixth time in an incredible eleven-year period in which Castleford, previously only winners once, in 1977, made eight appearances in the Yorkshire Cup final, winning four and finishing runners-up on the other four occasions. It was also the second season in succession that Castleford appeared, and lost, in the final within that eleven-year period.

Background 
In the 1988–89 season there were no junior/amateur clubs taking part, no new entrants and no "leavers" and so the total of entries remained the same at eighteen.
As a result, a preliminary round was required to reduce the number of clubs entering the first round to sixteen.

Competition and results

Preliminary round 
Involved 2 matches and 4 clubs

Round 1 
Involved 5 matches (with three byes) and 13 clubs

Round 2 - Quarter-finals 
Involved 4 matches and 8 clubs

Round 3 – Semi-finals 
Involved 2 matches and 4 clubs

Final

Teams and scorers 

Scoring - Try = four points - Goal = two points - Drop goal = one point

The road to success 
The following chart excludes any preliminary round fixtures/results

Notes and comments 
1 * The first Yorkshire Cup match played by the newly renamed Huddersfield who dropped the "Barracudas"'s suffix
2 * The record score (and highest winning margin) at the time for a Yorkshire Cup match, beating the previous record win of 79-5 (1948) 
3 * The receipts are given as £76,658 by the Rothmans Rugby League Yearbook of 1991-92 and 1990-91 but the details given in a section of the Huddersfield v Ryedale-York match programme for the Preliminary round on Sunday 23 August 1992 (and all verified by The Rugby League Record Keepers Club), show the receipts as £83,591

General information about the Rugby League Yorkshire Cup competition 
The Rugby League Yorkshire Cup competition was a knock-out competition between (mainly professional) rugby league clubs from Yorkshire. However teams were sometimes included from outside the county such as Newcastle, Mansfield, Coventry, and even London (in the form of Acton & Willesden).
The Rugby League season always (until the onset of "Summer Rugby" in 1996) ran from around August to May.  This competition always took place early in the season, in Autumn, with the final taking place in (or just before) December (The only exception was when disruption of the fixture list was caused during, and immediately after, the two World Wars).

See also 
1988–89 Rugby Football League season
Rugby league county cups

References

External links
Saints Heritage Society
1896–97 Northern Rugby Football Union season at wigan.rlfans.com 
Hull&Proud Fixtures & Results 1896/1897
Widnes Vikings - One team, one passion Season In Review - 1896-97
The Northern Union at warringtonwolves.org

RFL Yorkshire Cup
Yorkshire Cup